Edward Purcell may refer to:
 Edward A. Purcell Jr., American historian
 Edward Henry Purcell (died 1765), English organist, printer, and music publisher
 Edward Mills Purcell (1912–1997), American physicist, Nobel Prize winner
 Edward Purcell (musician) (1689–1740), English composer
 Edward Purcell (rugby league) (born 1988), Samoan rugby league international
 Teddy Purcell (Edward Purcell, born 1985), Canadian ice hockey player